Mafraq Qasabah is one of the districts  of Mafraq governorate, Jordan.

References 

 

Districts of Jordan